The GS&WR) Class 33 consisted of six  locomotives designed by Henry Ivatt for Kerry branch line services, especially tight radius curves of the branches to Kenmare and Valencia.

Numbers 33 and 42 were subsequently fitted with a bell for working the Cork City Railways. In their final years the class was mainly working in the Cork area, At the end of steam in the 1959 number 42 was to be found in the Dublin area.

References

 
 
 
 

2-4-2T locomotives
5 ft 3 in gauge locomotives
Railway locomotives introduced in 1892
Steam locomotives of Ireland
Scrapped locomotives